Henry Cárdenas Ordaz (born 30 October 1965) is a retired road cyclist from Colombia, who was a professional rider from 1986 to 1997. He was nicknamed "Cebollita".

Major results

1985
 1st Stage 10 Vuelta a Colombia
1987
 2nd Overall Critérium du Dauphiné Libéré
1st Stage 6
 9th Overall Vuelta a España
 10th Overall Vuelta a Colombia
1988
 1st Stage 2 Clásico RCN
1990
 9th Overall Vuelta a Colombia
1991
 10th Overall Vuelta a Colombia
1995
 2nd Overall Clásico RCN
1st Stage 4
1996
 1st Stage 2 Clásico RCN

Grand Tour general classification results timeline

External links
 

1965 births
Living people
People from Sogamoso
Colombian male cyclists
Sportspeople from Boyacá Department